Makria Sou Den Iparho (Greek: Μακριά Σου Δεν Υπάρχω) is the third full-length album released by popular Greek singer, Kelly Kelekidou. It was released in Greece on April 10, 2008 by Sony BMG Greece.  The album contains the three songs "Se Vgazo Akiro", "Gia Kapia Kseni", and "Se Thelo Me Trela" from Kelekidou's golden CD single "Se Thelo Me Trela".

Track listing
 "Kai Lipon..." - 3:19
 "Kai Ta Halasame" - 3:41
 "Ti Kouragio Na'ho" - 3:06
 "Ta Matakia" - 3:16
 "Se Vgazo Akiro" - 3:41
 "Gia Kapia Kseni" - 3:13
 "Me Peirazei" - 3:09
 "Se Thelo Me Trela" - 3:56
 "Aponi Kardia" - 4:02
 "Brosta Sou Tha Me Vriskeis" - 3:21
 "To Stavro Mou Tha Kano" - 3:33

Charts

References

2008 albums
Greek-language albums
Kelly Kelekidou albums
Sony Music Greece albums